Ivan Aleksandrovich Nagibin (born 21 March 1986) is a Russian former professional football player.

External links
 

1986 births
Living people
People from Chita, Zabaykalsky Krai
Russian footballers
FC Sibir Novosibirsk players
FC Tom Tomsk players
Russian Premier League players
FC Ufa players
FC Fakel Voronezh players
Association football midfielders
FC Chita players
Sportspeople from Zabaykalsky Krai